Iskra (Spark) was a Russian satirical weekly published in Saint Petersburg in 1859–1873.

The magazine, founded by the caricaturist Nikolai Stepanov and poet Vasily Kurochkin was a Socialist publication, targeting social inequality and the Tsarism. Yet, in its heyday it attracted a host of famous authors from diverse literary factions, including Alexey K. Tolstoy, Alexey Zhemchuzhnikov, Alexey Pleshcheyev, Lev Mei, Viktor Burenin, Liodor Palmin, Vladimir Shchiglev, Gleb and Nikolai Uspenskys, Alexander Levitov, Pavel Yakushkin, Fyodor Reshetnikov, Grigory Eliseev. Iskra became famous for its caricatures, made by the best Russian artists of the time, among them Nikolai Stepanov, Mikhail Mikeshin, Mikhail Znamensky.

Throughout its history Iskra suffered from severe censorship, and in 1865 was forced to part with Vasily Kurochkin. It was finally closed in 1873.

References

1859 establishments in the Russian Empire
1873 disestablishments in the Russian Empire
Defunct literary magazines published in Europe
Defunct magazines published in Russia
Magazines established in 1859
Magazines disestablished in 1873
Magazines published in Saint Petersburg
Literary magazines published in Russia
Russian-language magazines
Satirical magazines published in Russia
Socialist magazines
Weekly magazines published in Russia
Russian political satire